Faina Grigorievna Melnik ((Faina Hryhorivna Melnyk); 9 June 1945 – 16 December 2016) was a Soviet discus thrower, a 1972 Summer Olympics champion in the discus event. During her career she set 11 world records.

Career

Melnik was Jewish, and was born in Bakota, Khmelnytskyi, Ukraine. At the 1972 Summer Olympics, she broke the Olympic record three times, and set a world record at 66.62 metres. She had already broken the world record, at the 1971 European Athletics Championships, representing the then Soviet Union. In 1976 she had her best ever discus throw of 70.50 m, but finished only fourth at the 1976 Summer Olympics. At those Olympics she also competed in the shot put and finished tenth. She failed to reach the final in the discus event at the 1980 Games.

Continuing to throw after the 1980 Olympics, she set the masters world record in the W35 division that has stood since 1980.

Melnik graduated from the Moscow State University of Medicine and Dentistry and later worked as a dentist and athletics coach in Moscow. Her trainees include Natalya Lisovskaya and Svetlana Krivelyova. Melnik was married to Velko Velev, a Bulgarian discus thrower who also competed at the 1976 and 1980 Olympics.

She later became the inspiration for Miss Trunchbull in the Roald Dahl children's book Matilda.

See also
List of select Jewish track and field athletes

References

External links

Sporting Heroes bio
dataOlympic profile

1945 births
2016 deaths
Soviet female discus throwers
Soviet female shot putters
Soviet Jews
Ukrainian Jews
Spartak athletes
Olympic athletes of the Soviet Union
Olympic gold medalists for the Soviet Union
Ukrainian female discus throwers
Ukrainian female shot putters
Athletes (track and field) at the 1972 Summer Olympics
Athletes (track and field) at the 1976 Summer Olympics
Athletes (track and field) at the 1980 Summer Olympics
Jewish female athletes (track and field)
World record setters in athletics (track and field)
People from Bakota, Ukraine
Russian people of Ukrainian descent
European Athletics Championships medalists
Medalists at the 1972 Summer Olympics
Olympic gold medalists in athletics (track and field)
Burials in Troyekurovskoye Cemetery
Universiade medalists in athletics (track and field)
Track & Field News Athlete of the Year winners
Universiade gold medalists for the Soviet Union
Medalists at the 1973 Summer Universiade
Sportspeople from Khmelnytskyi Oblast